Discobitch is a French electronic music project founded by Kylian Mash with Laurent Konrad.

Their first and only single, "C'est beau la bourgeoisie", was a successful club single in a number of European countries. It was number 2 in France and Belgium (Flanders), number 4 in Belgium (Wallonia), number 19 in Switzerland and number 61 in Germany. It earned a gold disc in Belgium.

Singles

References

External links 
 MySpace.com - Kylian Mash / Discobitch
 MySpace.com - Laurent Konrad / DiscoBitch

French electronic music groups